Thanatos is a Dutch extreme metal band. With a history dating back to 1984, they are  the oldest death metal band from the Netherlands. Their second album, Realm of Ecstasy (some album covers show Realm of ), received positive marks from Dutch music magazine Oor and various international magazines for its solid compositions and challenging arrangements. After enduring constantly changing line-ups and problems with distribution, promotion, and even ownership of the rights to the second album, Thanatos folded in 1992, the final straw being the cancellation of a tour with Cannibal Corpse and Exhorder.

In 1999, founding member Stephan Gebédi revived the band, which signs with Hammerheart Records. After re-releasing the first two albums with demo and live tracks, the band's third full album, Angelic Encounters, emerged in 2000. In 2002 a mini-CD with original songs as well as covers from Celtic Frost and Possessed was released by Baphomet. After a few shows in Greece and a short tour with Pungent Stench, the band recorded their fourth album, Undead. Unholy. Divine, described as a solid return to 1980s metal (in the style of Slayer, Possessed) with the addition of blast beats. Release of a fifth album, Justified Genocide, was postponed when the band's label at the time, Black Lotus Records, went bankrupt; Dan Swano finished the mix for the CD. To celebrate more than twenty years of Dutch death metal, Thanatos released (on Chinese label AreaDeath Productions) a limited-edition box containing Emerging From The Netherworlds, Realm Of Ecstasy, and Angelic Encounters, besides 56 bonus tracks and 19 videos.

In February 2009, the band issued an update containing details about their upcoming album Justified Genocide. It was released on March 15 in Europe and April 6 in the UK and Ireland.

Century Media Records signed the band in 2012. The initial plan was to re-release the five studio albums of the band in 2012 and 2013, but the label offered the band a new recording contract which resulted in a new studio album from Thanatos in 2014, entitled Global Purification. This coincided with the band's 30th anniversary in that year. In 2019, Thanatos celebrated their 35th anniversary with a double-CD compilation album, a 7 inch vinyl EP and a special show in their hometown Rotterdam featuring a lot of former band members. Later that year Thanatos signed a new record deal with French label Listenable Records and started recording their seventh studio album. The album, Violent Death Rituals, had a March 2020 release.

Discography

Demos
 Speed Kills (1984)
 Rebirth (1986)
 The Day before Tomorrow (1987)
 Official Live Tape 1987 (1987)
 Omnicoitor (1989)

Studio albums
 Emerging from the Netherworlds (1990)
 Realm of Ecstasy (1992)
 Angelic Encounters (2000)
 Undead. Unholy. Divine. (2004)
 Justified Genocide (2009)
 Global Purification (2014)
 Violent Death Rituals (2020)

Live album
 Official Live Tape 1987 (2011 CD re-issue)

Compilation album
 Thanatology: Terror From The Vault (2019)

EP's
 Beyond Terror (2002)
 The Burning of Sodom/...And Jesus Wept (2006)
 Thanatos/Asphyx 7 inch split EP; Thanatos: Re-animation (Sacrifice-cover)/ Asphyx: Bestial Vomit (Majesty-cover) (2011)
 Blind Obedience/Thanatos (2019)

Members

Current
 Stephan Gebédi - Vocals, Guitars (1984–present)
 Paul Baayens - Guitars (1999–present)
 Mous Mirer - Bass (2019–present)
 Martin Ooms - Drums (2017–present)

Former
 Marcel van Arnhem - Drums (1984-1985)
 Remco de Maaijer - Guitars (1984-1985)
 André Scherpenberg - Bass (1986-1987)
 Rob de Bruin - Drums (1986)
 Remo van Arnhem - Drums (1986-1992)
 Erwin de Brouwer - Bass (1987), Guitars (1988-1992)
 Mark Staffhorst - Guitars (1987-1988)
 Ed Boeser - Bass (1988-1992)
 Theo van Eekelen - Bass (1999-2001)
 Aad Kloosterwaard - Drums (1999-2001)
 Marco de Groot - Drums (2009-2012)
 Yuri Rinkel - Drums (2001-2009, 2013-2017)
 Marco de Bruin - Bass, Guitars (2001-2019)

Timeline

References

External links 

Dutch death metal musical groups
Dutch thrash metal musical groups
Musical groups established in 1984
Musical groups disestablished in 1992
Musical groups reestablished in 1999
Musical quartets